Patryk Kubicki (born 9 October 1993) is a Polish footballer who plays as a midfielder for Mszczonowianka Mszczonów.

He is the son of Dariusz Kubicki.

Career
Kubicki made his debut in the Russian National Football League for FC Sibir Novosibirsk on 7 July 2013 in a game against FC Torpedo Moscow.

On 17 July 2019, Kubicki joined Sokół Ostróda.

On 3 August 2020, he rejoined Znicz Pruszków.

References

External links
 
 Career summary by sportbox.ru
 
 Profile at Znicz Pruszków 

1993 births
Footballers from Birmingham, West Midlands
Living people
Polish footballers
Ząbkovia Ząbki players
ŁKS Łódź players
Znicz Pruszków players
FC Sibir Novosibirsk players
I liga players
II liga players
III liga players
Russian First League players
Polish expatriate footballers
Polish expatriate sportspeople in England
Polish expatriate sportspeople in Russia
Expatriate footballers in England
Expatriate footballers in Russia
Association football midfielders